The 1988 World Rally Championship was the 16th season of the Fédération Internationale de l'Automobile (FIA) World Rally Championship (WRC). The season consisted of 13 rallies, following the same schedule as the previous season.

Martini Lancia followed their successful previous season with an even more dominant performance in 1988, winning ten of the eleven rallies in which manufacturer points were awarded. The Lancia Delta HF 4WD proved fast and reliable in the hands of returning drivers Finn Markku Alén and Italian Miki Biasion. During the season, the car was replaced by the Delta HF Integrale, which was an immediate success. Biasion would take the drivers' title, with his Finnish teammate placing second behind him. Third driver Frenchman Bruno Saby also contributed to the effort with a rally win, though was not a major contender for the title. Jolly Club driver, Italian Alex Fiorio, would take third place in the driver championship at the wheel of a Lancia Delta as well.

Ford Motor Company struggled to compete, though it was the only other manufacturer besides Lancia to win a rally, with primary driver Didier Auriol winning the Tour de Corse in his Sierra RS Cosworth. Auriol would only reach 6th in the drivers' competition, while Spanish teammate Carlos Sainz would struggle to reach 11th in the standings.  Stig Blomqvist, racing for Rallysport Sweden in a Sierra, would finish best amongst Ford drivers, taking 4th in the championship standings.

1988 marked the withdrawal of Audi Sport from the WRC, although a number of small teams and privateers were successful enough using Audi Quattro versions for the manufacturer to place 3rd amongst manufacturers despite the lack of a works effort. Mazda Rally Team Europe made a significant effort to compete with Finn Timo Salonen as their primary driver for the Mazda 323 4WD. Timo would garner 5th place in the driver standings while the manufacturer gained 4th place.

In addition to the primary driver and manufacturer championships, WRC also awarded the FIA Cup for Drivers of Production Cars for a second season. Belgian Pascal Gaban won the hotly contested contest in a Mazda 323 against Argentine Jorge Recalde in his Lancia Delta while Italian Giovanni Del Zoppo, another Delta pilot, finished well behind in third place.



Teams and drivers

Events

Championship for manufacturers

Championship for drivers

Cup for production car drivers

See also 
 1988 in sports

External links

 FIA World Rally Championship 1988 at ewrc-results.com

World Rally Championship
World Rally Championship seasons